Gone is the sixth studio album by American Christian rock band Red. It was released on October 27, 2017 through Essential Records. It was produced by Rob Graves. A 17-track digital deluxe edition is also available.

Recording 
In a March 2017 interview, guitarist Anthony Armstrong revealed the band, bassist and twin brother Randy Armstrong and singer Michael Barnes, were in the early stages of recording their sixth studio album. The sessions took place in the northeast US state of Maine, which is where their longtime producer Rob Graves lives and where their previous release, Of Beauty and Rage (2015), was also recorded. The location of the studio, surrounded by woods with wildlife, had a positive effect on the group and they agreed to return to record Gone with just Graves and themselves. By March 2017, the album's title had already been agreed upon by the band. Red took a break from recording in March 2017 to continue with the second half of their tour to commemorate the tenth anniversary of their debut album, End of Silence (2006).

Musically, Anthony noted that Gone continues the style of Red's previous albums as its approach is "alive and well", but wanted to avoid playing "the same four chords" as compared to other contemporary rock bands. Randy approached the album like the band was making its last, a thought he also had with each previous release which prompted him to give the fans "something heavy", yet makes people think about big questions in life. Red albums are known to address darker themes in their music, such as the struggles humans face in life.  Gone includes the band's second recorded cover in the form of "Unstoppable" by Australian musician Sia.

Release 
Gone was released on October 27, 2017. A digital pre-order became available on September 22, which included a digital download of "Still Alive", the radio single. Those who pre-order will have access to a second download on October 13, "Gone". A digital-only deluxe edition of the album includes 17 tracks. Limited edition packages were made available via the band's PledgeMusic site.

Critical reception 

In a review for Jesusfreakhideout, David Craft gave the album three stars out of five. He thought that while Gone remains "exceptionally listenable", it would leave a number of Red fans "frustratingly disappointed" due to their incorporation of more electronic music elements to their arrangements and the scarcity of memorable song hooks and melodies.

Track listing

Personnel 
Red
 Michael Barnes – lead vocals
 Anthony Armstrong – guitars, programming
 Randy Armstrong – bass, backing vocals

Additional musicians
 Joe Rickard – drums, programming, drum editing

Personnel
 Tom Baker – mastering
 Jeremy Cowart – band photography
 Rob Graves – producer, engineering, programming, string engineering
 Igor Khoroshev – programming, string arrangements
 Jason McArthur – executive producer
 Alex Niceforo – programming
 Oscar Nilsson – drum engineering
 Tim Parker – art direction, design
 Paul Pavao – mixing
 Jason Root – A&R
 Justin Spotswood – engineering

Charts

References 

Red (American band) albums
2017 albums